This is an article about qualification for the 2018 Men's U20 Volleyball European Championship.

Qualification summary

Pool standing procedure
 Number of matches won
 Match points
 Sets ratio
 Points ratio
 Result of the last match between the tied teams

Match won 3–0 or 3–1: 3 match points for the winner, 0 match points for the loser
Match won 3–2: 2 match points for the winner, 1 match point for the loser

Direct qualification

Qualification
The winners of each pools qualified for final round. The 2nd placed teams of each pool qualified for the next round.
Pools composition

First round

Pool A

|}

|}

Pool B

|}

|}

Pool C

|}

|}

Pool D

|}

|}

Pool E

|}

|}

Pool F

|}

|}

Pool G

|}

|}

Pool H

|}

|}

Second round

Pool I

|}

|}

Pool J

|}

|}

References

Men's Junior European Volleyball Championship
Europe